Mozzarella Stories is a 2011 Italian neo noir-comedy film written and directed by Edoardo De Angelis.

It was entered into the main competition at the 38th São Paulo International Film Festival.

Cast 

Luisa Ranieri: Sofia
Luca Zingaretti:Giulio Ricci
Giampaolo Fabrizio: Ciccio Dop
Andrea Renzi: The Accountant
Massimiliano Gallo: Angelo Tatangelo
Aida Turturro: Autilia Jazz Mood
Giovanni Esposito: Gigino Purpetta
Valerio Foglia Manzillo: Ciriello 
Marina Suma:  Sofia's mother 
Pia Velsi:  Ciriello's grandmother

See also 
 List of Italian films of 2011

References

External links

Italian crime comedy films
2011 directorial debut films
2011 films
2010s crime comedy films
Films about food and drink
Italian neo-noir films
2011 comedy films
2010s Italian films
2010s Italian-language films